The 2005 Chicago Cubs season was the 134th season of the Chicago Cubs franchise, the 130th in the National League and the 90th at Wrigley Field. The Cubs finished 79–83, 4th place in the NL Central. This was the first season for the WGN-TV broadcast pairing of Bob Brenly and Len Kasper.

Offseason
December 31, 2004: Todd Hollandsworth was signed as a free agent with the Chicago Cubs.
January 20, 2005: Cody Ransom was signed as a free agent with the Chicago Cubs.
 February 2, 2005: Sammy Sosa was traded by the Chicago Cubs with cash to the Baltimore Orioles for Jerry Hairston, Mike Fontenot, and Dave Crouthers (minors).
 February 2, 2005: Jeromy Burnitz was signed as a free agent with the Chicago Cubs. 
February 8, 2005: Scott McClain was signed as a free agent with the Chicago Cubs.
March 30, 2005: Cody Ransom was purchased by the Texas Rangers from the Chicago Cubs.

Regular season

Season standings

National League Central

Record vs. opponents

Transactions
May 2, 2005: Trenidad Hubbard was signed as a free agent with the Chicago Cubs.
May 27, 2005: Cody Ransom was signed as a free agent with the Chicago Cubs.
July 7, 2005: Trenidad Hubbard was released by the Chicago Cubs.
August 29, 2005: Todd Hollandsworth was traded by the Chicago Cubs to the Atlanta Braves for Angelo Burrows (minors) and Todd Blackford (minors).

Roster

Player stats

Batting

Starters by position
Note: Pos = Position; G = Games played; AB = At bats; H = Hits; Avg.= Batting average; HR = Home runs; RBI = Runs batted in

Other batters
Note: G = Games played; AB = At bats; H = Hits; Avg. = Batting average; HR = Home runs; RBI = Runs batted in

Pitching

Starting pitchers
Note: G = Games pitched; IP = Innings pitched; W = Wins; L = Losses; ERA = Earned run average; SO = Strikeouts

Other pitchers
Note: G = Games pitched; IP = Innings pitched; W = Wins; L = Losses; ERA = Earned run average; SO = Strikeouts

Relief pitchers
Note: G = Games pitched; W = Wins; L = Losses; SV = Saves; ERA = Earned run average; SO = Strikeouts

Farm system

References

2005 Chicago Cubs season at Baseball Reference
Season standings: National League Central Standings on ESPN.com
Game Logs:
1st Half: Chicago Cubs Game Log on ESPN.com
2nd Half: Chicago Cubs Game Log on ESPN.com
Batting Statistics: Chicago Cubs Batting Stats on ESPN.com
Pitching Statistics: Chicago Cubs Pitching Stats on ESPN.com

Chicago Cubs seasons
Chicago Cubs Season, 2005
Chicago Cubs